Dave Ellis (born 1965) is an author, video game writer and video game designer. He is also an avid classic arcade game collector and was a columnist for Gameroom Magazine.

Career
Ellis got his start in the video game industry with MicroProse in March 1992 in Hunt Valley, Maryland. He started out in customer service then transferred to QA and eventually worked his way up to game design. It is here Ellis was first exposed to X-COM, a game franchise he would be involved with one way or another for most of his career. In 1998, Ellis designed a new installment of the X-COM series, a space-shooter, X-COM: Interceptor.

Ellis remained with MicroProse for seven and half years, surviving two buy-outs (from Spectrum HoloByte and then Hasbro Interactive in 1999). During these years he served in various roles on several games. During this period, Ellis moved to the former MicroProse office in Chapel Hill, North Carolina to work as the designer of X-COM: Genesis. He along with the rest of the studio were laid off that same year when Hasbro decided it did not want to be a video game developer.

Ellis then went to work for a new developer formed by former members of the Chapel Hill studio, Vicious Cycle Software. After less than a year, he left to work as a game designer for Random Games in Morrisville, North Carolina and remained there until November 2001, since which time the company has gone out of business. In 2005, Ellis rejoined Vicious Cycle as a game designer where he worked as a designer or writer (often both) on 19 titles for the PC and 11 different consoles and handhelds. Ellis remained with the company until November 2015, when most of the team was laid off. Vicious Cycle closed its doors forever in January 2016.

In addition to designing games at Vicious Cycle, Ellis has written the stories and voice-over scripts for most of their games since 2005. Two of these games won game writing awards. Dead Head Fred won the first Writers Guild of America Award for Outstanding Video Game Writing in 2008, and Eat Lead: The Return of Matt Hazard won the 2009 Spike TV Video Game Award for Best Comedy Game. Many of the titles that Ellis has written for are licensed properties. He has written stories and scripts for games based on licenses from Cartoon Network (Adventure Time: Finn & Jake Investigations, Ben 10 Alien Force, and Ben 10 Omniverse), DreamWorks (Flushed Away, Madagascar 3 and Turbo), Universal (Despicable Me), Namco (Pac-Man and the Ghostly Adventures 1 and 2), and Warner Bros. (Yogi Bear). In 1998, Ellis wrote a story and script based on the Star Trek: The Next Generation franchise for the first-person shooter, Star Trek: Klingon Honor Guard.

Since 1995, Ellis has written numerous computer game strategy guides for different publishers. As an avid classic arcade game collector, Ellis is also the author of The Official Price Guide to Classic Video Games, an authoritative work covering all the ins and outs of collecting classic arcade games, handheld electronic games and classic video game consoles.

Personal life and education
Ellis holds a BSc from Towson University in Mass Communication (film and television production). Ellis has been married to Meghan Harkins since June 20, 1992. Currently, Meghan and Ellis make their home in North Carolina with a number of pet dogs and one cat.

References

External links
 The Game Writer, Ellis' official freelance video game writing site.
 DavesClassicArcade, Ellis' web site dedicated to his arcade game collection, covers many aspects of collecting

 Dave Ellis Interview: A three-part interview with Ellis regarding X-COM: Interceptor and X-COM: Genesis

1965 births
Living people
American video game designers
Towson University alumni
Video game writers